The 1968–69 UCLA Bruins men's basketball team won an unprecedented third consecutive NCAA National Basketball Championship, the fifth in six years under head coach John Wooden with a win over Purdue, coach Wooden's alma mater. The Bruins opened with 25 wins, on a 41-game winning streak, but lost the regular season finale to rival USC on March 8, which snapped a home winning streak of 85 games.

The West Regional was hosted by UCLA in Pauley Pavilion, and they defeated #12 New Mexico State 53–38 and third-ranked Santa Clara 90–52. Center Lew Alcindor had a total of 33 points in the two games.

In the Final Four at Louisville, Kentucky, UCLA had a two-point lead at halftime over #11 Drake and won 85–82 to advance to the championship game against sixth-ranked Purdue. Wooden graduated from Purdue in 1932, after earning All-American honors as a guard on the school's basketball team that he captained during his junior and senior years. The Boilermakers won two Big Ten titles and the 1932 national championship during his years there. Wooden also played baseball during his freshman year.

The "Money Man", John Vallely, scored 29 points and Alcindor had 25 points at the semi-final game. Alcindor scored 37 points with 20 rebounds in the championship game.

Players

Schedule

|-
!colspan=9 style=|Regular Season

|-
!colspan=12 style="background:#;"| NCAA Tournament

Rankings

Notes
 Three consecutive national championships for the Bruins, five in six years. 
 This was the first year in which the Athletic Association of Western Universities officially adopted the name Pacific-8 Conference, although that name had been used unofficially since the 1964–65 season after Oregon and Oregon State joined the conference.
 USC, after losing a 61–55 double-overtime game to UCLA at the Sports Arena the night before, defeated the Bruins, 46–44, at Pauley Pavilion with a slowdown game. The Trojans' win ended four extended winning streaks by the Bruins:
 51 games in Pauley Pavilion.
 41 overall.
 45 in AAWU/Pac-8 play.
 17 over USC.
 Last season for the 7-foot-1 and 1/2-inch center Lew Alcindor (later known as Kareem Abdul-Jabbar), who led the Bruins to an overall three-year record (1967–1969) of 88–2, and is the only player in history to be named three-time NCAA Final Four Most Outstanding Player. In 1969, Alcindor earned the first ever Naismith Trophy, given to the nation's top player.
 On the 40th anniversary, the team was honored at halftime of UCLA's Senior Day game, March 7, 2009, at Pauley Pavilion.
 Lew Alcindor's father played trombone with the UCLA band during the championship game.
 This team was honored at the January 26, 2019 game against Arizona on its 50th anniversary.

Awards and honors
 Lew Alcindor, NCAA basketball tournament MOP (1969)
 Lew Alcindor, Naismith College Player of the Year
 Lew Alcindor, Helms Foundation Player of the Year award 
 Lew Alcindor, First Team All-American

Team players drafted into the NBA

References

External links

1968–69 UCLA Bruins at Sports-Reference.com

Ucla Bruins
UCLA Bruins men's basketball seasons
NCAA Division I men's basketball tournament championship seasons
NCAA Division I men's basketball tournament Final Four seasons
Ucla
UCLA Bruins
UCLA Bruins